Fontcouverte may refer to the following places in France:

Fontcouverte, Aude, a commune in Aude
Fontcouverte, Charente-Maritime, a commune in Charente-Maritime